Shaanxi cuisine, or Qin cuisine, is derived from the native cooking styles of Shaanxi Province and parts of northwestern China.

Description
Shaanxi cuisine makes elaborate use of ordinary materials, and is best known for its noodles and lamb/mutton dishes. It makes heavy use of strong and complex flavours. There is an emphasis on savoury flavours such as salt, garlic, onion and vinegar; sugar is seldom used. The main cooking methods are steaming, frying and stir-frying.

Due to its geographical location between the provinces of Shanxi and Sichuan, the flavours of Shaanxi cuisine include both the sour and spicy of Sichuan cuisine, and the salty flavours of Shanxi. Shaanxi cuisine's primary flavor profile is xiāng là (香辣) or "fragrant spicy".

Shaanxi cuisine uses more noodles than other Chinese cuisines, but Shaanxi noodles are almost always thicker and longer than those of Beijing cuisine, and to a lesser degree, Shanxi cuisine.

The taste of Shaanxi cuisine can be quite spicy; however, this can be diluted by adding soy sauce. Many different types of meat are used in Shaanxi cuisine such as duck, lamb, chicken, and beef. Additionally, there are vegetarian mixed dishes where no meat is included, the extra flavour being provided by more spices, resulting in these dishes being considerably spicier.

Regional styles
Shaanxi cuisine includes three regional styles:
 Northern Shaanxi style is characterised by the wide use of steaming as the method of cooking. The most common meat is pork, although lamb and mutton are also popular.
 Guanzhong style, which uses pork and lamb / mutton equally with heavy flavours and tastes.
 Hanzhong style, similar to Sichuan cuisine, is characterised by its spicy taste.

Dishes
The following is a selected list of dishes in Shaanxi cuisine.

References

 
Regional cuisines of China